The Kudara no Konikishi was a Japanese clan whose founder, Zenkō ( or ), was a son of King Uija, the last king of Baekje, in southwestern Korea.

Kudara was an uji, or clan name, and represented its country of origin, Baekje. Konikishi or Kokishi, which literally means "king", was a special kabane that was given only to the former royal families of Baekje and Goguryeo: the Kudara, Shōna (肖奈) and Koma (高麗) clans.

The founder Zenkō came from Baekje to Japan as a hostage along with his brother Hōshō in 643. Even though Japan sent Hōshō back to Korea for a failed campaign to revive Baekje, Zenkō remained in Japan. The former royal family members were treated as "barbarian guests" (蕃客) and were not incorporated into the domestic political system of Japan for some time. They enjoyed privileged treatment although they were obliged to serve to the emperor in a symbolic fashion.

They were finally assimilated into Japanese bureaucracy in 691. They were given the name "Kudara no Konikishi" sometime afterward. The event has drawn scholarly attention, and a couple of theories have been proposed to explain the reason why they were given that peculiar name at that particular time. One theory associates the event with the enforcement of the Asuka Kiyomihara Code in 689, the law that entailed clarification of their legal status. However, while being subjects to the Japanese emperor, they still needed to represent the Baekje kingship by the special name. Japan applied to itself the Chinese ideology of emperorship that required "barbarian people" to long for the great virtue of the emperor. It was, however, difficult for Japan to keep the concept in concrete form in real international politics. Silla, which had acted as a vassal state in the 670s, changed its attitude and brought tension with Japan. In response, Japan treated Kudara no Konishiki as a "barbarian king" to reaffirm Silla's vassalage.

In 790, Emperor Kanmu issued a rescript that treated the Kudara no Konikishi clan as "relatives by marriage." It was related to the fact that the emperor's mother, Takano no Niigasa, belonged to the Baekje-originated Yamato no Fuhito clan, who then claimed its roots in the Baekje royal family.

Another theory attempts to interpret the rise and the fall of the Kudara no Konikishi clan in the context of domestic politics, rather than political ideology. The clan fell under the influence of the southern branch of the Fujiwara clan after Kudara no Konikishi Myōshin had married Fujiwara no Tsugutada around 754. The emperor's rescript of 790 aimed to support Myōshin's appointment as lady-in-waiting (尚侍), the highest post among court ladies, despite her humble origin. She helped the clan's other female members enter the imperial court. Their prosperous days ended in 807, when Fujiwara no Takatoshi, the son of Tsugutada and Myōshin, fell from power in an imperial succession dispute. They declined from the latter half of the 9th century to the early 10th century and disappeared from the political scene.

Notable members of the Kudara no Konikishi clan include:
Kudara no Konikishi Zenkō (617-700) - The founder of the clan
Kudara no Konikishi Shōsei (?-674) - son of the founder
Kudara no Konikishi Rōgu (661-737) - Vice Governor of Settsu
Kudara no Konikishi Kyōfuku (697-766) - Lord of Justice
Kudara no Konikishi Shuntetsu (740-795) - General of Peace Guard for Mutsu and Vice Delegate of Conquering East-Barbarian
Kudara no Konikishi Bukyō - Governor of Dewa

Notes

External links
  Kudara no Konishiki Genealogy Tree (百済氏祖系)Warning: This page contains pieces of family trees which are not considered historical facts by historians.

Japanese clans
Japanese people of Korean descent